Ru Ba Ru is a 2008 Indian drama film directed by the debutant director Arjun Bali. Filmed in Hindi, the film revolves around the relationship between a live-in couple caught amidst their busy professional careers. The film stars actors Randeep Hooda and a relative newcomer Shahana Goswami in the leading role. Rati Agnihotri, Kulbhushan Kharbanda and Jayant Kriplani play the supporting roles. This movie is an adaptation of Junger's film If Only (2004).

Plot
Tara Mishra (Shahana Goswami), an aspiring actress and singer, and Nikhil Singh (Randeep Hooda), a young professional in an advertising firm have been in a relationship since a few years. Kulbhushan Kharbanda is a  taxi driver.

Tara wants to cement their relationship by having him meet her parents as a commitment to a marriage. But Nikhil, who is workaholic and professionally ambitious, is always pre-occupied with his work. Saying that he is happy with the way things are between the two of them, he stashes away her proposal for marriage.

Trouble brews between them when Nikhil constantly forgets little things about her and their relationship. He begins to take Tara, her family and friends for granted. When Tara cannot take this behavior of Nikhil anymore, she decides to take matters in her own hand. That's when a strange magical, mystical force intervenes, and what happens next forms the rest of the story.

Tara is hit by a taxi, and dies in the hospital. Nikhil is left helpless and sobbing. However, the next morning, he finds Tara lying on the bed besides him alive! This makes him realise that he's been given a second chance to patch up and rectify his mistakes. All is well, until at the end another tragedy occurs, and that is the taxi got hit by another vehicle.

Cast

Randeep Hooda as Nikhil "Nick" Singh
Shahana Goswami as Tara Mishra / Ms. Ria
Kulbhushan Kharbanda as Taxi Driver
Rati Agnihotri as Meera Singh, Nikhil's mother
Jayant Kripalani as Dilip, Nikhil's step-father
Avinesh Rekhi as Wedding Singer
 Jeneva Talwar as Nadia
 Jeetu Savlani as Jay, Nikhil's friend
 Prince Shah as Tybalt

Production
Debutant director Arjun Bali previously worked on advertisements before venturing into commercial cinema. Randeep Hooda, who had previously worked in action films such as D (2005) and Risk (2007), thought of experimenting with a romantic film hoping that it might bring him the much elusive success in the Bollywood film industry. When Bali approached Hooda with the film's story, the latter instantly liked the title. The film was titled Ru Ba Ru, which transliterates into soul to soul, with actress-model Mandira Bedi's suggestion. For the film, Hooda shaved his moustache away as he "wanted to look soft and romantic." While saying that his character in the film was quite similar to his real life persona, Hooda thought it was great working with relative newcomer Shahana Goswami. Goswami previously featured in Yun Hota Toh Kya Hota (2006), Honeymoon Travels Pvt. Ltd. (2007) and Rock On!! (2008), the former two being cameo appearances. She was signed on for this film before her graduation. The characters she portrays in Rock On!! and this film were strikingly similar. Due to this, she was worried that this might typecast her in her future films.

Multiple Music-Directors: Satyadev Barman with Ranjit Barot, Strings with Shuja Haider (Speed of Sound) and Sameer Uddin composed the music of the film, while the soundtrack lyrics is written Shuja Haider, Soumik Sen, Chester Misquitta, Aditya Narayan, Arjun Chandramohan Bali and Akshay Verma. Shuja Haider, Ranjit Barot, Sunidhi Chauhan, Kunal Ganjawala, Vijay Prakash, Suzanne D'Mello and Shreya Ghoshal featured as singers in the soundtrack.

Release and reception
The film, which released on 12 September 2008, earned average reviews by the critics. sify.com  and indiafm.com said Debutante director Arjun Bali's choice of the subject may be debatable, but you can't shut your eyes to the fact that he has handled the subject with dexterity.Rediff.com appreciated the performance of the lead actors, Randeep Hooda and Shahana Goswami and added that the adaptation of Hollywood film If Only (2004) could have been better. Movie reviewers from The Economic Times, Sify.com and NDTV corroborated the fact that the film was an Indian adaptation of the Hollywood film. When asked in an interview about this, Hooda evaded a direct answer. Instead he became defensive and said that every film is inspired in some way or other, and that there have been films around before-and-after aspect of life.

References

External links
 

2008 films
2000s Hindi-language films